Vaiņode Municipality is a former municipality in Courland, Latvia. The municipality was formed in 2009 by merging Embūte parish and Vaiņode parish; the administrative centre being Vaiņode. The population in 2020 was 2,235.

Vaiņode Municipality ceased to exist on 1 July 2021, when it was merged into the newly-formed South Kurzeme Municipality.

See also 
 Administrative divisions of Latvia (2009)

References 

 
Former municipalities of Latvia